Gary Jennings Jr. (born March 7, 1997) is an American football wide receiver for the St. Louis BattleHawks of the XFL. He played college football at West Virginia.

Early years
Gary attended Colonial Forge High School in Stafford, Virginia. He played quarterback, wide receiver and safety in high school. He committed to West Virginia University to play college football.

College career
Jennings played at West Virginia from 2015 to 2018. During his career, he played in 50 games with 22 starts and had 168 receptions for 2,294 yards and 17 touchdowns.

Professional career

Seattle Seahawks
Jennings was drafted by the Seattle Seahawks in the fourth round (120th overall) of the 2019 NFL Draft. He was waived on November 5, 2019, without appearing in a game.

Miami Dolphins
On November 6, 2019, Jennings was claimed off waivers by the Miami Dolphins. He was placed on injured reserve on November 20, 2019.

On September 5, 2020, Jennings was waived by the Dolphins.

Baltimore Ravens
Jennings was signed to the Baltimore Ravens' practice squad on December 16, 2020, and released on December 22.

Buffalo Bills
On December 30, 2020, Jennings was signed to the Buffalo Bills' practice squad. He was released on January 4, 2021.

Indianapolis Colts
Jennings signed a reserve/future contract with the Indianapolis Colts on January 6, 2021. He was waived/injured on August 8, 2021, and placed on injured reserve. On August 12, 2021, Jennings was waived from injured reserve with an injury settlement.

Las Vegas Raiders
On November 11, 2021, Jennings was signed to the Las Vegas Raiders practice squad, but was released four days later.

Kansas City Chiefs
On January 11, 2022, Jennings signed a reserve/future contract with the Kansas City Chiefs. He was waived on May 5, 2022, but re-signed five days later. He was waived on August 15, 2022. He was reverted to the Chiefs injured reserve a day later. He was released on August 24.

St. Louis BattleHawks
Jennings was drafted in the 8th round of the Open Phase of the 2022 XFL Draft by the St. Louis BattleHawks.

References

External links
West Virginia Mountaineers bio

1997 births
Living people
People from Stafford, Virginia
Players of American football from Virginia
Sportspeople from the Washington metropolitan area
American football wide receivers
West Virginia Mountaineers football players
Seattle Seahawks players
Miami Dolphins players
Baltimore Ravens players
Buffalo Bills players
Indianapolis Colts players
Las Vegas Raiders players
Kansas City Chiefs players